Botswana men's national softball team is the national team for Botswana. The team competed at the 1992 ISF Men's World Championship in Manila, Philippines where they finished with 3 wins and 5 losses.  The team competed at the 1996 ISF Men's World Championship in Midland, Michigan where they finished with 1 win and 9 losses.  The team competed at the 2000 ISF Men's World Championship in East London, South Africa where they finished ninth. The team competed at the 2004 ISF Men's World Championship in Christchurch, New Zealand where they finished thirteenth.  The team competed at the 2009 ISF Men's World Championship in Saskatoon, Saskatchewan where they finished thirteenth. However in 2017 they finished eighth.

References

Men's national softball teams
softball
Softball in Botswana
Men's sport in Botswana